Highland Range may refer to:

 Highland Range (Lincoln County)
 Highland Range (Clark County)

See also
 Highland Mountains